The Men's Greco-Roman 67 kg is a competition featured at the 2021 European Wrestling Championships, and was held in Warsaw, Poland on April 24 and April 25.

Medalists

Results 
 Legend
 F — Won by fall
WO — Won by walkover

Final

Top half

Bottom half

Repechage

References

External links
Draw

Men's greco-roman 67 kg